The 2016–17 season was the club's fourth season in the Scottish Premiership and their eighth consecutive season in the top flight of Scottish football. St Johnstone also competed in the Scottish Cup and the League Cup.

Season summary

Tommy Wright was kept as manager and remained for the season. The Saints again finished in Fourth place but qualified for European Football. Danny Swanson was the club's Top League and Season scorer, but a few weeks before the end of the season, he signed for a pre-contract agreement with Hibernian.

Results & fixtures

Pre-season

Scottish Premiership

Scottish League Cup

Group B

Scottish Cup

Squad statistics

Appearances
 

|-
|colspan="10"|Players who left the club during the 2016–17 season
|-

|-
|colspan="10"|Players who left the club on loan during the 2016–17 season
|-

|}

Goalscorers
As of 21 May 2017

Team statistics

League table

Transfers

Players in

Players out

See also
List of St Johnstone F.C. seasons

References

St Johnstone F.C. seasons
St Johnstone